Quil Lemons (born 1997) is an American photographer. His work has been exhibited at the Philadelphia Museum of Art and the International Center of Photography. In 2021, he became the youngest person to photograph the lead image used on the cover of Vanity Fair.

Early life and education 
Lemons grew up in South Philadelphia. He attended the Charter High School for Architecture and Design in Philadelphia and The New School in New York.

Career 
In 2017, Lemons released a photo series called GlitterBoy. His photographs have been featured in publications including The New York Times, Variety, and Vogue. Lemons' photograph of Billie Eilish was used on the March 2021 cover of Vanity Fair, making him the youngest person ever to photograph the magazine's cover image.  He was the photographer for the advertising campaign of the Savage X Pride Collection celebrating LGBT Pride from Rihanna's Savage X Fenty fashion label.

Lemons was included in the book The New Black Vanguard: Photography Between Art and Fashion by Antwaun Sargent.

Exhibitions 

 2018: Detour, Philadelphia Museum of Art
 2021: David H. Koch Theater, American Ballet Theatre
 2021-2022: INWARD: Reflections on Interiority, International Center of Photography

Personal life 
Lemons lives in Brooklyn, New York.

References

External links 
 quillemons.com

American photographers
African-American photographers
People from Philadelphia
1997 births
Living people
21st-century African-American people